Fortitudo Pallacanestro Bologna 103, commonly known as Fortitudo Bologna and currently known as Fortitudo Kiğılı Bologna for sponsorship reasons, is a basketball club based in Bologna, Italy and currently plays in the second division.

History
Fortitudo has for much of its history played second fiddle in its own city to arch rivals Virtus Bologna, with whom it contest the fierce Bologna Derby. Fortitudo won its first major trophy in 1998, winning the Italian Cup.

Fortitudo made the Italian league finals ten consecutive years (1997–2006). After three straight finals losses, Fortitudo won the Serie A for the first time in 2000. Four consecutive finals losses were followed by Fortitudo's second league title in 2005, courtesy of a 3–1 win over Armani Jeans Milano in the finals series when instant replay upheld a Ruben Douglas buzzer beater in Game 4 of the championship series.

In recent years, Fortitudo had been a fixture in the European top-tier Euroleague. Fortitudo's first achievement in European competition was a FIBA Korać Cup final against Jugoplastika in 1977 in their maiden participation. It got to the Euroleague Final four in 1999 (losing in the semifinal against city rivals Kinder Bologna and in third place game against Olympiacos) and the semifinal of the Euroleague playoffs in 2001 (again eliminated by rivals Virtus); then the club lost in the Euroleague final in 2004 to Maccabi Tel Aviv by 44 points. The 2006–07 season saw them change coaches thrice as they finished thirteenth (out of eighteen), though they still qualified for the 2007–08 ULEB Cup.

Due to economic irregularities, upon Fortitudo's relegation from the 2008–09 season, the team was not allowed to participate in the 2009–10 Serie A2, restarting from the Serie A dilettanti. After winning that league, Fortitudo was once again excluded from Serie A2 and the club's affiliation to the Italian Federation revoked. As such, Fortitudo was barred from playing in any league, save for youth development leagues.

The Rebirth and return to the top flight 
On 18 June 2013, a group of local entrepreneurs, professionals and fans joined to give life to Fortitudo Pallacanestro Bologna 103, the spiritual successor (with the same fan base such as the Fossa dei Leoni fan group) of the original entity. Starting from the fourth division DNB, Fortitudo climbed to the second division Serie A2 where it played during the 2015–16 season.

After a successful campaign in 2018–19, the club qualified for promotion to Serie A for the first time since its 2009 dissolution. They later qualified to the 2020–21 Basketball Champions League, but they finished last in their group. In the 2021–22 season, they finished in the 15th position to be relegated to Serie A2.

Honours

Domestic competitions
 Italian League
 Winners (2): 1999–00, 2004–05
 Runners-up (8): 1995–96, 1996–97, 1997–98, 2000–01, 2001–02, 2002–03, 2003–04, 2005–06
 Italian Cup
 Winners (1): 1997–98
 Runners-up (1): 1967–68
 Italian Supercup
 Winners (2): 1998, 2005
 Serie A2 Basket
 Winners (1): 2018–19
 Runners-up (1): 2015–16
 Italian LNP Cup
 Winners (1): 2010
 Italian League Serie B
 Winners (1): 2014–15

European competitions
 EuroLeague
 Runners-up (1): 2003–04
 Semifinalists (1): 2000–01
 4th place (1): 1998–99
 Final Four (2): 1999, 2004
 FIBA Korać Cup
 Runners-up (1): 1976–77
 Semifinalists (1): 1995–96

Other competitions
 Copa de Andata Carisbo
 Winners (1): 2007
 Via Resa, Italy Invitational Game
 Winners (1): 2007

Top performances in European & Worldwide competitions

Retired numbers

Players

Current roster

Depth chart

Notable players

  John D. Douglas 
 - George Bucci 
  Andrea Dallamora 
 - Wallace Bryant 
  Daniele Albertazzi 
  Moris Masetti 
  Bill Garnett 
  Artis Gilmore 
  Vincent Askew 
  Gene Banks 
  Chris McNealy 
  Dave Feitl 
  Pete Myers 
  Cedrick Hordges 
  Valdemaras Chomičius 
  Teoman Alibegović 
  Shaun Vandiver 
  Dallas Comegys 
  Corrado Fumagalli 
  Dan Gay 
  Vincenzo Esposito 
  Aleksandar Đorđević 
  Carlton Myers 
  Alessandro Frosini 
  Mike Brown 
  Conrad McRae 
  Eric Murdock 
  Gregor Fučka 
  Giacomo Galanda 
  Roberto Chiacig 
  David Rivers 
  Dominique Wilkins 
  Gianluca Basile 
  Marko Jarić 
  Artūras Karnišovas 
  Damir Mulaomerović 
  Vinny Del Negro 
  Stojko Vranković 
  Anthony Bowie 
  Eddie Gill
  Eurelijus Žukauskas 
  Vassil Evtimov 
  Emilio Kovačić 
  John Celestand 
  Anthony Goldwire 
  Dan McClintock 
  Marko Milič 
  Rumeal Robinson 
  Zoran Savić 
  Stefano Mancinelli 
  Gianmarco Pozzecco 
  Carlos Delfino 
  A. J. Guyton 
  Luboš Bartoň 
  Vlado Šćepanović 
  Mate Skelin 
  Davor Marcelić 
  Marco Belinelli 
  Erazem Lorbek 
  Matjaž Smodiš 
  Miloš Vujanić 
  Hanno Möttölä 
  Dalibor Bagarić 
  Amal McCaskill 
  Ruben Douglas 
  Nate Green 
  Sani Bečirovič 
  Yakhouba Diawara 
  Kiwane Garris 
  Travis Watson 
 - David Bluthenthal 
  Alain Digbeu 
  Tyus Edney 
  Goran Jurak 
  Jérôme Moïso 
  Moochie Norris 
  Preston Shumpert 
  Kristaps Janičenoks 
  Earl Barron 
  Marcelinho Huertas 
  Kieron Achara 
  Jamont Gordon 
  Uroš Slokar 
  Joseph Forte 
  James Thomas 
  Qyntel Woods 
  D. J. Strawberry 
  Lazaros Papadopoulos 
  Davide Lamma  
  Marco Carraretto  
  Stefano Mancinelli

Players at the NBA draft

Head coaches

    
  Beppe Lamberti (1966–1973)
  Dido Guerrieri (1973–1974)
  Alberto Bucci (1974)
  Aza Nikolić (1974–1976)
  John McMillen (1976–1980)
  Mauro Di Vincenzo (1980–1981)
  Dodo Rusconi (1981–1983)
   Rudy D'Amico (1983)
  Francesco Zucchini and Andrea Sassoli (1983–1984)
  Andrea Sassoli (1984–1988)
  Mauro Di Vincenzo (1988–1990)
  Stefano Pillastrini (1990-1992)
  Lino Bruni
  Marco Calamai
  Dario Bellandi
  Sergio Scariolo (1993-1996)
  Valerio Bianchini (1996-1998)
  Petar Skansi (1998-1999)
  Carlo Recalcati (1999-2001)
  Matteo Boniciolli (2001-2002)
  Jasmin Repeša (2002-2006)
  Fabrizio Frates (2006)
 
  Ergin Ataman (2006-2007)
  Massimiliano Oldoini /   Dan Gay (2007)
  Andrea Mazzon (2007-2008)
   Dragan Šakota (2008)
  Cesare Pancotto (2008-2009)
  Alessandro Finelli
  Antonio Tinti 
  Federico Politi
  Claudio Vandoni
  Matteo Boniciolli (2015-2018)
  Gianmarco Pozzecco (2018)
  Antimo Martino (2018-2020, 2021-2022)
  Romeo Sacchetti (2020)
  Luca Dalmonte (2020-21, 2022-)

Sponsorship names
Throughout the years, due to sponsorship, the club has been known as :

Cassera Bologna (1966–68)
Eldorado Bologna (1968–71)
Alco Bologna (1971–78)
Mercury Bologna (1978–80)
I&B Bologna (1980–81)
Lattesole Bologna (1981–83)
Yoga Bologna (1983–88)
Arimo Bologna (1988–90)
Aprimatic Bologna (1990–91)
Mangiaebevi Bologna (1991–93)
Filodoro Bologna (1993–95)
Teamsystem Bologna (1995–99)
Paf Wennington Bologna (1999–01)
Skipper Bologna (2001–04)
Climamio Bologna (2004–07)
UPIM Bologna [Domestically] (2007–08)
Beghelli Bologna [European competition] (2007–08)
GMAC Bologna  [Domestically] (2008–09)
Fortitudo Bologna  [European competition] (2008–09)
Amori Bologna (2009–10)
Tulipano Impianti Bologna (2013–14)
Eternedile Bologna (2014–16)
Contatto Bologna (2016–17)
Consultinvest Bologna (2017–18)
Lavoropiù Fortitudo Bologna (2018–19)
Fortitudo Pompea Bologna (2019–20)
Lavoropiù Fortitudo Bologna (2020–21)
Fortitudo Kiğılı Bologna (2021–present)

References

External links

 
 Serie A historical results  Retrieved 23 August 2015
 Euroleague profile
 Official Supporters Site 

1932 establishments in Italy
Basketball teams established in 1932
Basketball teams in Emilia-Romagna
Sport in Bologna